The action of 5 November 1916 was a naval engagement of the First World War. The action was fought between a Royal Navy submarine and a dreadnought squadron of the Imperial German Navy. This action took place in the months after the Battle of Jutland and is significant in that it signalled a major shift in German naval policy.

Background
On 2 November 1916, the German U-boat  suffered a mechanical failure while patrolling off the Norwegian coast. They met and both U-boats started for the Danish coast, where they were to be met off the Bovsberg Light. The British meanwhile had intercepted this wireless traffic, and dispatched a destroyer force to intercept them, but were unsuccessful.

However, on 4 November, both U-boats went aground in evening fog. Concerned that the Danes would intern the two U-boats—or that the British would find them—and mindful of the reputation of U-20 and her skipper as being responsible for the sinking of the ocean liner , Admiral Scheer—the commander of the High Seas Fleet—dispatched a salvage group, with a cover force, comprising destroyers of the 4th Half-Flotilla, with the battlecruiser . This move was also detected by the British, who alerted the submarine , which was on patrol in the area.

On the evening of 5 November, J1 encountered the Battle squadron and was able to attack.

Action
Laurence went deeper to manoeuvre into a firing position, but on rising to periscope depth he saw the dreadnoughts had changed course and were moving away. Surfacing to take advantage of J1s higher surface speed, but risking detection by the Squadrons destroyer escort, Laurence again moved into a firing position and at 12:08 dived to launch a spread of four torpedoes. Two of these hit, striking Grosser Kurfurst astern and Kronprinz on the bow. Both were damaged, but were able to return to base under their own steam. J1 had not been seen by any of the screening destroyers during her approach and they were unable to make an effective counterattack. Laurence remained submerged until 14:30, when he surfaced to an empty sea.

The two damaged dreadnoughts were able to return to base, but both remained in dock under repair for several months. The other forces were able to return without incident. U-30 was also able to return to base, but U-20 as unrecoverable, and was scuttled to avoid capture.

Laurence was awarded a Bar to his Distinguished Service Order for this action.

Aftermath
Following this action, Scheer came under criticism from Pless, the Naval chief of staff, and the Kaiser himself, who felt that risking so many capital ships of the High Seas Fleet, and having two dreadnoughts put out of action, for the sake of two U-boats, was inappropriate. However, Scheer defended himself robustly, stating that it was imperative to give the men of the U-boat arm the fullest possible support. He also stated that Germany's naval strategy should be to concentrate all her efforts on the U-boat offensive, and that henceforth the principal role of the German surface fleet should be to ensure the U-boat force was able to get to sea safely, and to return safely home. It was a striking demonstration of the shift in German naval policy from the pursuit of naval supremacy through her surface fleet, to the war on commerce by her U-boat arm.

Notes

References
 Halpern, Paul: A Naval History of World War I (1995) 
 Kemp, Paul: U-Boats Destroyed ( 1997) 
 J1 at RAN history page

Naval battles of World War I involving Germany
North Sea operations of World War I
Naval battles of World War I involving the United Kingdom
Conflicts in 1916
November 1916 events